AvtoRadio is a Moscow-based radio station. The station plays songs in Russian and English. A variety of music from different genres.

History 
It broadcasts music and information. It started broadcasting on 5 April 1993 and is part of the VKPM Media Group (Veshchatelnaya Korporatsiya Prof-Media, a division of Interros).

It broadcasts to Moscow and Moscow region on 90.3 MHz FM, across Russia (there are three regional variants), Armenia, Latvia, and worldwide via the internet.

According to VKPM, in April 2006 the average daily number of listeners was 1,097,000, or 11.6% of the total number of listeners in Moscow and Moscow Region.

Avtoradio announced to broadcast from within Vancouver, Canada during the 2010 Winter Olympic Games, the first time in history that a Russian radio station would be broadcasting from Canada.

See also
Euro disco
Italo disco
Interros (parent company)
Serhiy Kurchenko

References

External links
 AvtoRadio Official website
 VKPM Media Group
AvtoRadio Live

Radio stations established in 1993
Radio stations in Russia
Russian-language radio stations
Mass media in Moscow
1993 establishments in Russia